Fences is a 2016 American drama film directed by Denzel Washington and written by August Wilson. Starring Washington, Viola Davis, Jovan Adepo and Stephen McKinley Henderson, the film focuses on a man and his life, family, and job. The film began a limited release on December 16, 2016, before opening wide on December 25. The film was released to universal acclaim, with Rotten Tomatoes listing an approval rating of 93%, based on 207 reviews, with an average rating of 7.7/10, and Metacritic listing a score of 79 out of 100, based on 48 reviews.

Fences won the Academy Award for Best Supporting Actress and the British Academy Film Award for Best Actress in a Supporting Role for Davis. The film won Best Supporting Actress for Davis and was nominated for Best Picture, Best Director, Best Actor for Washington, Best Acting Ensemble and Best Adapted Screenplay at Critics' Choice Awards. The film won Best Supporting Actress – Motion Picture for Davis and was nominated for Best Actor – Motion Picture Drama for Washington at Golden Globe Awards. The film received four nominations at Satellite Awards, including Best Film, Best Director, Best Actor for Washington and Best Supporting Actress for Davis.

Accolades

Notes

References

External links 
 

Lists of accolades by film